Michael Zabel (born 1978) is an American politician. He served as a Democratic member of the Pennsylvania House of Representatives for the 163rd district from 2019-2023.

Early career

After graduating from St. Joseph's Preparatory School in 1996, Zabel went on to earn a bachelor's degree from the College of the Holy Cross in 2000. He earned a master's degree from Temple University in 2003, and his JD from Temple Law School in 2010. Zabel taught Latin and Greek at the middle and high school levels. He served as assistant district attorney in Philadelphia, and is on the board of the charity SJP Man for Others.

Pennsylvania House of Representatives 
Zabel defeated Jamie Santora in the 163rd district in 2018, receiving 15,000 votes.

In 2023, a union lobbyist accused Zabel of sexual harassment, filing a complaint with the House Ethics Committee. After the first accusation, two more allegations emerged against Zabel in the following days. Previously in 2018, Zabel's campaign manager accused him of inappropriately touching her. At the time, she reported it to Democratic party leaders, but did not go public until the allegations from the lobbyist were made.  The same day the campaign manager's allegations were made public, an article on a conservative news site relayed a story from an anonymous female lawmaker who said Zabel once followed her to her car after rejecting his advances.   The lawmaker later identified herself as State Representative Abby Major. Zabel resisted calls to resign because of the allegations and said he would seek treatment for his "illness." He later reversed his earlier statement and announced he would resign from office effective March 16, 2023.

Personal life 
He is married to Lauren Zabel and has two children. They live in the Drexel Hill neighborhood of Upper Darby Township, Delaware County, Pennsylvania.

References

Living people
Democratic Party members of the Pennsylvania House of Representatives
1978 births
College of the Holy Cross alumni
People from Upper Darby Township, Pennsylvania
21st-century American politicians

State and local political sex scandals in the United States